Luwagga William Kizito (born 20 December 1993) is a Ugandan professional footballer who plays as a winger for Azerbaijani club Sabail.

Club career

Vipers
Born in the district of Wakiso, Kizito began his football career with local club Vipers S.C. in 2009, at the age of 15. During his first professional season with the Vipers in 2010, the team won the Ugandan Super League for the first time ever. He remained with the club for a further two seasons.

Leixões
In summer 2012, Kizito signed with Portuguese second division side Leixões, becoming the first Ugandan footballer to play for a Portuguese team.
He made his debut for the Matosinhos club on 16 September against Leça in a Taça de Portugal second round tie. He scored one goal as his team won 4–1. He followed up with goals in the Taça da Liga and Segunda Liga, against Vitória de Setúbal and Braga B. His goal scoring continued during the next several games with goals against Naval in domestic league action.
His goal scoring attracted interest from Porto. Kizito, however, suffered a goal-scoring drought as he scored only two goals from October to the end of the season. Despite this drought, he helped his side finish third in the league, five points short of Arouca, who finished second and be promoted to the top flight. During his first season with Leixões, he made 30 appearances and scored seven goals.

Covilhã
On 4 January 2014, Kizito signed with S.C. Covilhã.

Rio Ave
He then moved to Rio Ave in July 2015.

Shakhter Karagandy(loan)
On 13 March 2019, Shakhter Karagandy announced the loan signing of Kizito for the 2019 season.

Hapoel Kfar Saba
On 9 January 2020 signed the Israeli Premier League club Hapoel Kfar Saba.

International career
Kizito received his first call up to the Ugandan national team in 2012. On 4 June 2016, Kizito scored his first international goal - against Botswana. Kizito participated in the 2017 Africa Cup of Nations. After the tournament, coach of the Uganda cranes Milutin Sredojević vowed never to call up Kizito to cranes duty after a misunderstanding with the orthodox tactician.

Career statistics

Scores and results list Uganda's goal tally first, score column indicates score after each Kizito goal.

Honours
Vipers
Ugandan Super League: 2009–10

BATE Borisov
Belarusian Premier League: 2018

References

External links
 
 

1993 births
Living people
People from Wakiso District
Ugandan footballers
Association football midfielders
Uganda international footballers
Vipers SC players
Leixões S.C. players
S.C. Covilhã players
Rio Ave F.C. players
C.D. Feirense players
FC Politehnica Iași (2010) players
FC BATE Borisov players
FC Shakhter Karagandy players
Hapoel Kfar Saba F.C. players
Hapoel Nof HaGalil F.C. players
Sabail FK players
2017 Africa Cup of Nations players
2019 Africa Cup of Nations players
Liga Portugal 2 players
Primeira Liga players
Liga I players
Belarusian Premier League players
Kazakhstan Premier League players
Israeli Premier League players
Azerbaijan Premier League players
Ugandan expatriate footballers
Expatriate footballers in Portugal
Expatriate footballers in Romania
Expatriate footballers in Belarus
Expatriate footballers in Kazakhstan
Expatriate footballers in Israel
Expatriate footballers in Azerbaijan
Ugandan expatriate sportspeople in Portugal
Ugandan expatriate sportspeople in Romania
Ugandan expatriate sportspeople in Belarus
Ugandan expatriate sportspeople in Kazakhstan
Ugandan expatriate sportspeople in Israel
Ugandan expatriate sportspeople in Azerbaijan